Harbiye (Ancient Greek: Dàphne, Δάφνη; in Arabic دفنه or Harbiyat, حربيات) is a town in Hatay Province, Turkey

Geography 

It is situated in the valley of Asi (formerly known as Orontes) with an average altitude of  The population was 25,118 as of 2012 and it is higher than most other towns.

History 
Dàphne (Δάφνη in Greek) was a resort port-town during Seleucid Empire, famous for waterfalls, daphnes, and residence buildings. However, it was also famous for earthquakes; many ancients buildings were demolished during big earthquakes. Under the Roman Empire, aqueducts were built to connect the local springs to the city of Antioch and there were several villas in Daphne. 

For many centuries, many monastic communities from different ethnicities settled in the region around Antioch as for instance in Daphne. The Kastana monastery, dedicated to the Theotokos, was close to the Kastalia springs in Daphne. Ephrem Mtsire, a famous 11th century Georgian monk, theologian and translator of patristic literature, was hegumen of this monastery.

Economy 

Main economic activity is domestic tourism; hotels, restaurants, souvenir shops etc. The town is proud of the Daphne mythology. There is also a minor silk industry. On the other hand, owing to closeness some Harbiye residents work in Antakya.

References 

Populated places in Hatay Province
Seleucid colonies in Anatolia
Roman towns and cities in Turkey
Towns in Turkey
Defne District